Okanagan Hockey School is a series of instructional ice hockey camps for youth players. The original school was founded in Penticton, British Columbia in 1963 by minor league hockey players Larry Lund and Nick Iannone. On-ice training was held at the Penticton Memorial Arena, with dryland training in the field behind the arena, and classroom instruction at the nearby Penticton Convention Centre. In the 1970s, the school expanded with a dorm for out-of-town students at Queen's Park Elementary School, and a second school location at McLaren Arena, also in Penticton.

Okanagan Hockey School is the longest continuously-running hockey school in the world. In 2004, Lund sold the organization to a group headed by Andy Oakes and former NHL players Alan Kerr and Jeff Finley.

In Canada, Okanagan Hockey Camps currently operate six locations, including Penticton and Kelowna, British Columbia, and St. Pölten, Austria, as well as a partnership with the Edmonton Oilers.

Okanagan Hockey Camps has programs designed for male and female players of all levels from 5–20 years old. There are regular- and elite-level programs offered for players and goaltenders, including specialized programs for skating, power skating, shooting, and defense.

The Okanagan Hockey Group also operates the Okanagan Hockey Academy, which is a year-round program based out of Penticton that plays in the Canadian Sport School Hockey League.  The OHA is a public-private partnership with Penticton Secondary School and is operated out of the South Okanagan Events Centre.

In addition to Okanagan Hockey Camps and Okanagan Hockey Academy, Okanagan Hockey Group is also in a partnership with the Western Hockey League in their WHL Combines program.

References

External links 
 Official website

Ice hockey schools
Buildings and structures in Penticton